The following is a list of churches in the Diocese of Carlisle.

Summary of mission communities

Cathedral

Appleby Deanery

Closed churches in this deanery

Barrow Deanery

Closed churches in this deanery

Brampton Deanery

Closed churches in this deanery

Calder Deanery 

1church meets in hall after church building closed in 2017

Closed churches in this deanery

Carlisle Deanery

Derwent Deanery

Furness Deanery

Closed churches in this deanery

Kendal Deanery

Penrith Deanery

Solway Deanery

Closed churches in this deanery

Windermere Deanery

Closed churches in this deanery

References

Diocese of Carlisle
Carlisle